Diya Aur Toofan is a 1995 Indian Hindi-language action film directed by K. Bapaiah, starring Mithun Chakraborty, Madhoo, Suresh Oberoi, Mohnish Bahl and Kader Khan. This film was released on 27 October 1995 under the banner of BMB Combines. This film is a remake of the 1979 Kannada movie Seetharamu.

Plot
Gajendra Singh is a very wealthy contractor who, with his partner Madanlal, sells government provided building materials into the black market, exchanging them for inferior ones. A civil engineer and his supervisor find out and, upon their meeting, are subsequently murdered by Gajendra. While Dr. Vijay is unable to treat the two workers, he gets a letter informing himself that his friend Amar, a gold medalist engineer, is the replacement engineer for the crooked contractors.  Amar, just like his predecessors, is very honest and won't do with what his bosses tell him to. After an attempt to bribe Amar, the contractors get beaten up, and Amar threatens to expose them.  Joginder, Gajendra's son, is a rogue who sets his eyes on Asha, Amar's eventual wife-to-be. On their wedding night, Gajendra, Madanlal, and Joginder all stab Amar, and Asha, when finding out, goes crazy. During a frenzied visit to the temple one night, she slips and falls down the stone steps leading to permanent brain damage. Vijay then transplants Amar's brain into Asha's body, and Asha eventually kills the trio one by one. Before she hangs Gajendra, she is shot by the police, and in a dying soliloquy, claims that she will be with Amar for eternity.

Cast
Mithun Chakraborty as Amar
Madhoo as Asha
Suresh Oberoi as Dr. Vijay Mehra
Prem Chopra as Thakur Gajendra Singh
Mohnish Behl as Joginder Singh
Shakti Kapoor  as Madanlal Tabedaar
Kader Khan as Gyaneshwar
Asrani as Solanki

Music
"Kundi Dheere Se Khatkana" - Ila Arun
"Dhoom Tara Tara Dhoom Tara Tara" - Kavita Krishnamurthy, Kumar Sanu
"Sapno Me Dekha Tha" - Sudesh Bhosle
"Odhe Lal Chunariya" - Kavita Krishnamurthy
"Nagri Nagri Dhunda O Sajna" - Udit Narayan, Kavita Krishnamurthy
"Ek Diya Aur Toofan" - Alka Yagnik

References

External links
 

1995 films
1990s Hindi-language films
Mithun's Dream Factory films
1990s science fiction action films
Films shot in Ooty
Films directed by K. Bapayya
Films scored by Bappi Lahiri
Hindi remakes of Kannada films
Indian science fiction action films